Camille Koenig (born 23 June 2001) is a Mauritian swimmer.

In 2019, she represented Mauritius at the 2019 World Aquatics Championships held in Gwangju, South Korea. She competed in the women's 50 metre freestyle event. She did not advance to compete in the semi-finals. She also competed in the women's 200 metre backstroke event and in this event she also did not advance to the semi-finals. In 2019, she also represented Mauritius at the 2019 African Games held in Rabat, Morocco without winning a medal.

References 

Living people
2001 births
Place of birth missing (living people)
Mauritian female swimmers
Mauritian female freestyle swimmers
Female backstroke swimmers
African Games competitors for Mauritius
Swimmers at the 2019 African Games